= South Slavic =

South Slavic may refer to:

- South Slavic languages, one of three branches of the Slavic languages
- South Slavs, a subgroup of Slavic peoples who speak the South Slavic languages
